NBC 39 may refer to:

 KNSD in San Diego, California (O&O)
 WNBJ-LD in Jackson, Tennessee
 WRAL-EX in Raleigh, North Carolina (ATSC 3.0 simulcast)